The Dom ("cathedral") is a Brick Gothic Lutheran church, the largest church in the German city of Güstrow. It was built as a collegiate church and has never actually been a cathedral. Initially completed in 1335, the church is the oldest extant building in Güstrow. It houses the sculpture Der Schwebende ("The Floating One"), a war memorial created by Ernst Barlach.

External links
Dom zu Güstrow website

References

Brick Gothic
Buildings and structures in Rostock (district)
Christian architecture
Gothic architecture in Germany